Younginidae is an extinct family of diapsid reptiles from the Late Permian and Early Triassic. In a phylogenetic context, younginids are near the base of the clade Neodiapsida. Younginidae includes the species Youngina capensis from the Late Permian of South Africa and Thadeosaurus colcanapi from the Late Permian and Early Triassic of Madagascar. Heleosuchus griesbachi from the Late Permian of South Africa may also be a member of the family.

Younginidae was traditionally assigned to Eosuchia, an order containing an assemblage of basal diapsids now thought to represent an evolutionary grade rather than a true clade. In 1945 paleontologist Alfred Romer reclassified Younginidae within a new group, Younginiformes, grouping it with the families Tangasauridae and Prolacertidae. Romer considered Younginidae to include many genera that are no longer classified as younginids: Paliguana, Palaegama, and Saurosternon are now considered basal lepidosauromorphs, Galesphyrus and Heleosuchus are diapsids of uncertain affinities (incertae sedis), Heleophilus is now a millerettid, and Heleosaurus is now thought to be a varanopid synapsid. Like Eosuchia, Younginiformes is no longer considered valid; for example, the phylogenetic analysis of Reisz et al. place younginids close to Sauria, the clade including the still-living archosauromorph and lepidosauromorph reptiles, while the younginiform family Tangasauridae takes a more basal position in Neodiapsida. Below is a cladogram from that analysis:

References

Prehistoric reptile families
Prehistoric reptiles of Africa
Lopingian first appearances
Early Triassic extinctions
Prehistoric neodiapsids